Urban Logistics REIT is a property company which invests in warehouses. The company is listed on the London Stock Exchange and is a constituent of the FTSE 250 Index.

History
The company was launched on the Alternative Investment Market as Pacific Industrial & Logistics REIT plc in April 2016. It changed its name to Urban Logistics REIT in March 2018. It acquired a portfolio of seven warehouses from Legal & General Investment Management in April 2020, and raised an additional £250 million in capital and transferred to the main market as in December 2021.

Operations
The company specialises in warehouses. Its portfolio was valued at £1.0 billion as at 31 March 2022.

References

External links
 Official site

Companies established in 2016
Companies listed on the London Stock Exchange